Peress is a surname. Notable people with the surname include:

 Gilles Peress (born 1946), French photojournalist
 Irving Peress, (1917–2014), American target of Senator Joseph McCarthy
 Joseph Salim Peress (1896–1978), British diving engineer
 Maurice Peress (born 1930), American conductor
 Paul Peress, American jazz drummer